The marbled snout-burrower (Hemisus marmoratus) is a species of frog in the family Hemisotidae.
It is found in sub-Saharan Africa.
Its natural habitats are subtropical or tropical dry forest, subtropical or tropical moist lowland forest, dry savanna, moist savanna, subtropical or tropical moist shrubland, subtropical or tropical high-altitude grassland, swamps, freshwater lakes, intermittent freshwater lakes, freshwater marshes, intermittent freshwater marshes, arable land, plantations, seasonally flooded agricultural land, and canals and ditches. It is also called the mottled shovelnose frog and marbled shovelnose frog.

References

Hemisus
Taxonomy articles created by Polbot
Amphibians described in 1854
Taxa named by Wilhelm Peters